The Nishnawbe-Aski Police Service (NAPS), also occasionally known as the Nishnawbe Aski Police Service (without a hyphen) is the police agency for Nishnawbe-Aski Nation (NAN). As of July 2020, NAPS has 34 detachments in NAN communities across the territory covered by Treaty 9 and Treaty 5 within Ontario. Mr. Roland Morrison was sworn in as chief of police in 2019.

As of July 2020, the agency has 203 officers, about 60% of whom are Indigenous, making NAPS the largest Indigenous police force in Canada, and the second-largest in North America. NAPS is responsible for a jurisdiction that includes two-thirds of Ontario, a land area approximately the size of France. NAPS receives 48% of its funding from the government of Ontario, and 52% from the government of Canada.

History 

The Nishnawbe-Aski Police Service was formed on January 14, 1994 through a tri-partite agreement between the governments of Canada, Ontario, and the Nishnawbe-Aski Nation. The primary goal of the agreement was the establishment of an aboriginal agency to provide efficient, effective and culturally appropriate policing to the Nishnawbe-Aski communities.

The first phase of the agreement began on April 1, 1994 and lasted four years, when all First Nation constable positions were transferred from the Ontario Provincial Police (OPP) to NAPS. Phase two began on January 1, 1998 when Wahgoshig, Matachewan, Mattagami, Brunswick House, Chapleau Ojibwe, Chapleau Cree, Constance Lake and Aroland First Nations were transferred.

The Nishnawbe-Aski Police Service gained responsibility for the OPP's Northwest Patrol Unit on June 1, 1998, excluding the communities of Big Trout Lake, Weagamow, Muskrat Dam, and Pikangikum. An Operations Transition Committee was formed to oversee the transfer of administrative and operations matter between NAPS and the OPP. The transition was complete on April 1, 1999.

Hardships 

Many NAPS detachments fail to meet national building codes and many officers live in crowded conditions or lack residences in the communities in which they serve. On February 25, 2008 Chief Jonathan Soloman of Kashechewan First Nation gave the Government of Ontario 30 days to start relieving the situation or he would pull his community out of the NAPS policing agreement. On March 26, 2008, Chief Soloman extended the deadline after receiving indication that the Canadian and Ontario governments were interested in resolving policing issues in NAPS-served communities.  A new policing agreement was reached in 2009.

As of February 2008, only one of the thirty-five detachments met building codes (that in the Moose Cree First Nation). A fire at the Kashechewan First Nation detachment on January 9, 2006 killed two persons held in the lockup and severely injured an officer during a rescue attempt.

The Kasabonika First Nation detachment was closed in early February 2008 as it lacked running water and relied on a wood fire in a 170-litre drum to heat the facility. Holding cells lacked toilet facilities, requiring detainees to use a slop bucket. Prisoners had to be flown to Sioux Lookout, costing as much as $10,000 per trip. As of February 2013, the Kasabonika detachment was operational, although it had only one on-duty officer.

As of February 2008, NAPS had an annual budget of $23,000,000, and the estimated cost to replace or renovate aging detachments was approximately $34,000,000. A new funding agreement was reached in 2018, allowing the hiring of 79 new officers over a five-year period, along with upgrades to key infrastructure and communications systems. However, the police force remains poorly funded, with a 2020 operations budget of around $37,700,000 and expenses approaching $40,000,000.

A Sacred Calling 

A Sacred Calling is an 18-minute documentary which focuses on the difficulties of policing remote NAN communities in Northern Ontario which are compounded by insufficient funding. The documentary was made by National Chief of the Assembly of First Nations RoseAnne Archibald, who hopes the film will get attention from the federal and provincial governments to help rectify the situation. The film shows officers living in motels, and using wood blocks to hold inmates in their cells.

Detachments 

Detachments are located in 34 communities. NAPS headquarters is located at 309 Court Street South, Thunder Bay. It has regional offices in Cochrane, Sioux Lookout and Thunder Bay.

 Northeast Region - Cochrane

Attawapiskat First Nation
Brunswick House First Nation
Chapleau Cree First Nation
Chapleau Ojibwe First Nation
Fort Albany First Nation
Kashechewan First Nation
Matachewan First Nation
Mattagami First Nation
Moose Cree First Nation
Taykwa Tagamou Nation
Wahgoshig First Nation
Weenusk First Nation

 Northwest Region - Sioux Lookout

Bearskin Lake First Nation
Cat Lake First Nation
Deer Lake First Nation
Fort Severn First Nation
Keewaywin First Nation
Mishkeegogamang First Nation
Muskrat Dam Lake First Nation
North Spirit Lake First Nation
Poplar Hill First Nation
Sachigo Lake First Nation
Sandy Lake First Nation
Slate Falls First Nation

 Central Region - Thunder Bay

Aroland First Nation
Constance Lake First Nation
Eabametoong First Nation
Kasabonika First Nation
Kingfisher First Nation
Marten Falls First Nation
Lansdowne House
Nibinamik First Nation
Webequie First Nation
Wunnumin Lake First Nation

Governance 

The Nishnawbe-Aski Police Service is governed by a board consisting of a representative of each Nishnawbe-Aski Nation Tribal Council. An independent review board ensures accountability to the communities. NAPS is not subject to the Ontario Police Services Act, though as a result of the 2018 funding agreement, there is pending Ontario legislation to allow NAPS to opt in to the Police Services Act, which would mandate accountability standards and oversight.

Former Chiefs

Fleet

 Ford F-Series pickups including F-350
 Dodge Charger cruisers
 Ford E-Series vans
 Chevrolet Tahoe SUV - used by K9 unit
 Pilatus PC-12-45 - operated by Wasaya Airways

Retired
 Ford Crown Victoria cruisers - former
 Chevy Yukon SUV - former

Ranks

 Constable
 Detective Constable
 Sergeant
 Detective Sergeant
 Road Sergeant
 Staff Sergeant
 Administrative Sergeant
 Regional Inspector / Regional Commander
 Deputy Chief
 Chief of Police

Special Units
 Guns and Gangs Unit
 Provincial Anti-Violence Intervention Strategy
 Sexual Assault Classification Unit
 Drug Unit

References

External links 
 Nishnawbe-Aski Police Service
 "A Sacred Calling" Documentary video. Retrieved 2010.05.21

Law enforcement agencies of Ontario
Nishnawbe Aski Nation
Organizations based in Thunder Bay
Law enforcement agencies of First Nations in Canada
1994 establishments in Canada
First Nations organizations in Ontario